Natalia Solodinina (born December 13, 1997) is a Russian female acrobatic gymnast. With partners Victoria Sukhareva and Natalia Lavrukhina, Solodinina competed in the 2014 Acrobatic Gymnastics World Championships.

References

1997 births
Living people
Russian acrobatic gymnasts
Female acrobatic gymnasts
21st-century Russian women